Sofia Belattar (born 9 February 1995) is a Moroccan judoka.

In 2019, she won the silver medal in the women's 63 kg event at the African Judo Championships held in Cape Town, South Africa. In 2020, she also won the silver medal in this event at the African Judo Championships held in Antananarivo, Madagascar.

Achievements

References

External links 
 

Living people
1995 births
Moroccan female judoka
Place of birth missing (living people)
Competitors at the 2018 Mediterranean Games
African Games medalists in judo
African Games bronze medalists for Morocco
Competitors at the 2019 African Games
21st-century Moroccan women